Duida–Marahuaca National Park is a protected area in Amazonas state, Venezuela. It has an area of 210,000 ha, and includes the Duida–Marahuaca Massif.

The national park was established in 1978. It has been included within the Alto Orinoco-Casiquiare Biosphere Reserve, which was designated in 1993.

Endemic fauna

Frogs
Venezuela's tepuys are the home of a number of endemic frog species.  Sometimes these species are known from only a single tepuy, as is the case of several which are to be found in the national park.
Cerro Duida
 Mount Duida frog (Dischidodactylus duidensis)
 Cerro Marahuaca
Several frog species are only known from the summit of Cerro Marahuaca, including Pristimantis marahuaka, Metaphryniscus sosai, and Myersiohyla inparquesi.

Birdlife
 Duida grass finch (Emberizoides duidae)

See also
 List of national parks of Venezuela
 Cerro Huachamacari

References

External links

National parks of Venezuela
Guayana Highlands
Geography of Amazonas (Venezuelan state)
Important Bird Areas of Venezuela
Protected areas established in 1978
1978 establishments in Venezuela
Tourist attractions in Amazonas (Venezuelan state)
IUCN Category II